Premier Bank Premier Bank is a privately owned Sharia compliant commercial bank incorporated in Somalia in 2013 and licensed by the Central Bank of Somalia in 2014.  It is the first bank in Somalia to allow MasterCard credit cards and partner with Visa.

History 

Premier Bank was opened on May 21, 2015 according to Sharia law by private Somali investors with banking experience from South Sudan, Djibouti and Kenya. The bank's official opening ceremony was opened by former Somali President Hassan Sheikh Mohamud. 

The bank has branches in Mogadishu as well as Hargeysa, Somaliland.

Premier Bank in partnership with MasterCard and SWIFT provides to its local clients for global online financial services.

Premier Bank's chairman Jibril Hassan Mohamud announced during the Mogadishu Tech Summit 2018 a fund of one million dollars for Somali tech startups.

References

21st-century establishments in Somalia
Banks established in 2013

Banks of Somalia